Keltie Hansen (born May 13, 1992) is a Canadian freestyle skier. She won a bronze medal in the halfpipe at the 2011 FIS Freestyle World Ski Championships.

References

External links
 FIS-Ski.com Profile

1992 births
Living people
Canadian female freestyle skiers
Freestyle skiers at the 2014 Winter Olympics
Olympic freestyle skiers of Canada